The Schreder Airmate HP-9 is an American high wing, single seat glider that was designed by Richard Schreder and intended to be flown by the designer in the 1960 World Gliding Championships.

Airmate was the name of Schreder's design company.

Design and development
The HP-9, the HP indicating high performance, was Schreder's FAI Standard Class follow-on design to the FAI Open Class HP-8 and was built to compete in the 1960 Worlds in the newly established Standard Class, but was not completed in time. The HP-9 was sold unfinished to Bob Litle, Jr who had Javelin Aircraft complete the glider.

The HP-9 is constructed entirely of aluminium and has an all-flying stabilator tail. The aircraft also features dive brakes and a retractable monowheel undercarriage.

Only one HP-9 was built.

Operational history
The sole HP-9 was still in existence in April 2011 and was listed by the Federal Aviation Administration as having been sold to the Centre County, Pennsylvania Visitor Bureau.

Specifications (HP-9)

See also

References

1960s United States sailplanes
Schreder aircraft